The transverse cervical nerve (superficial cervical or cutaneous cervical) arises from the second and third spinal nerves, turns around the posterior border of the sternocleidomastoideus about its middle, and, passing obliquely forward beneath the external jugular vein to the anterior border of the muscle, it perforates the deep cervical fascia, and divides beneath the Platysma into ascending and descending branches, which are distributed to the antero-lateral parts of the neck. It provides cutaneous innervation to this area.

During dissection, the sternocleidomastoid (SCM) is the landmark.  The transverse cervical nerves will pass horizontally directly over the SCM from Erb's point.

Additional images

References

External links
  
 

Nerves of the head and neck